Plumer House is a historic home located at West Newton, Westmoreland County, Pennsylvania.  The original section was built in 1814, with an addition made in 1846.  The original section is a -story, wood-frame structure with a gable roof.  The addition is a -story, brick structure with a gable roof and two chimneys.  It features a rear porch overlooking the adjacent Youghiogheny River.

It was added to the National Register of Historic Places in 1979.

References

External links

Houses on the National Register of Historic Places in Pennsylvania
Historic American Buildings Survey in Pennsylvania
Houses completed in 1846
Houses in Westmoreland County, Pennsylvania
National Register of Historic Places in Westmoreland County, Pennsylvania